The National Colonial Flag was a forerunner for the many Australian flag designs which featured the Southern Cross and Union Flag in combination. It is the first recorded attempt to design a distinctive national flag for Australia. Designed by Captain John Bingle and Captain John Nicholson, both New South Wales residents, it is inspired by the White Ensign of the Royal Navy, the protector and defender of Australia from 1788 to 1913. The large red cross of St George features four white, eight pointed stars representing the Southern Cross. According to Bingle it was adopted by the Government of Sir Thomas Brisbane, the Governor of New South Wales from 1821 to 1825. The National Colonial Flag was the first flag designed specifically to represent Australia.

See also

List of Australian flags

References

External links

Australian culture
Flags of Australia
Southern Cross flags
1823 introductions